Freak Out may refer to:

Film and TV
 Freak Out (film), a 2004 British horror-comedy film
 Freak Out (TV series), an ABC Family original series
 Freak Out, a film by Brad Jones loosely based on the last night of Dean Corll

Games
 Freak Out: Extreme Freeride, a 2007 skiing game
 Stretch Panic or Freak Out, a PlayStation 2 video game

Music

Albums
 Freak Out!, an album by The Mothers of Invention
 Freak-Out, an album by Aion
 Freak Out! (Teenage Bottlerocket album)
 Freak Out: The Greatest Hits of Chic and Sister Sledge
 Freak Out, an album by Tehosekoitin
 I Freak Out (EP), an extended play by The Hard Aches

Songs
 "Le Freak" or "Freak Out", a 1978 song by Chic
 "Freak Out", a song by 311 from Music
 "Freak Out", a song by Avril Lavigne from Under My Skin
 "Freak Out", a song by September from Dancing Shoes
 "Freak Out", a song by Liars from Liars
 "Freak Out", a song by B*Witched from B*Witched
 "Freaking Out", a song by Adema from Adema

Other uses
 Freak Out! (magazine), a Peruvian music magazine
 Freak Out (ride), a pendulum-based fairground ride

See also
 Freaked Out (disambiguation)
 Freak Out, It's Ben Kweller, a demo by Ben Kweller
 "Victorious: Freak the Freak Out", an episode of Victorious
 "Freak the Freak Out", a song by the cast of Victorious, featuring Victoria Justice
 Operation Freakout, a campaign by Scientology to silence a critic